Prem Raj also known as Prem Soni is an Indian film director. He has directed Ishkq in Paris and Main Aurr Mrs Khanna.

Filmography
Ishkq in Paris (2013)
Main Aurr Mrs Khanna (2009)

References

Hindi-language film directors
Indian male screenwriters
Living people
Year of birth missing (living people)